Christmas in the Park may refer to:

 Christmas in the Park (New Zealand)
 Christmas in the Park (San Jose)
 Christmas in the Park (Six Flags México)